Jürgen Elsässer (born 20 January 1957 in Pforzheim) is a German journalist and political activist of the new right.

Life
Jürgen Elsässer was born in 1957, the son of a watchmaker and a secretary. His two sisters and he were "typically left-wing late 68s", said Elsässer about his youth. His father was a conservative CDU-voter.

Elsässer became a teacher. Even if he was in communist groups, he swore on the Liberal democratic basic order of the German state to become a Beamter as teacher. He worked as a teacher in a vocational school in Baden-Württemberg, Germany for 14 years before beginning his career as journalist for left-wing magazines in 1994. Elsässer published his first works in the newspaper Arbeiterkampf (Workers' Struggle), a magazine which was tied to the Kommunistischer Bund (communist league), an organisation of which he was a member for years. In 1990 he was a sharp critic of the German reunification, because he was afraid of the possible dawn of a Viertes Reich (Fourth Reich).

Elsässer was one of the political creators of the Anti-Germans movement. In 1994, he was editor of the leftist Junge Welt (Young world). He was also co-editor of the largest left-wing monthly magazine konkret until he was dismissed.

Elsässer switched to the right. In 2010, he founded Compact magazine, of which he was also the editor.

In 2011, Elsässer expressed his admiration for Serbian leader Slobodan Milošević. During the 2014 pro-Russian unrest in Ukraine, Elsässer was an outspoken supporter of Russian president Vladimir Putin and received much criticism from the German media for his position.

Elsässer's current political position is commonly considered as right-wing populist and he is a sharp critic of the migration policy of the German chancellor Angela Merkel.

Reception 
Melanie Amann of Der Spiegel wrote about Elsässer, his appearance is "a mixture of evangelical preacher and teleshopping moderator" and this would "work independently of his message." Similar to this Dietmar Koschmieder, editor in chief of junge Welt said 2018 in Der Spiegel: "If you ask me, [Elsässer] has no convictions at all... He is an expert in emotionalization who adapts his message to the respective target and audience."

The rapper Danger Dan called Jürgen Elsässer an “anti-Semite” in his song "Das ist alles von der Kunstfreiheit gedeckt" ("This is all covered by artistic freedom", referring to article 5 of German Basic Law) in 2021.

References

1957 births
Living people
German journalists
German male journalists
Anti-immigration politics in Germany
People from Pforzheim
German activists
German male writers
New Right (Europe)
Junge Welt editors